Raymond H. Brenner (March 18, 1898 – June 14, 1975) was a professional football player who played 2 seasons in the National Football League, with the Canton Bulldogs. He played during the 1925 season. He is listed by the Pro Football Researchers Association as being one of the smallest professional football players of all-time.

Notes

1898 births
1975 deaths
People from Stark County, Ohio
Players of American football from Ohio
Canton Bulldogs players